Charles Porterfield Krauth (March 17, 1823 – January 2, 1883) was a pastor, theologian and educator in the Lutheran branch of Christianity.  He is a leading figure in the revival of the Lutheran Confessions connected to Neo-Lutheranism in the United States.

Education and parish ministry 

Born in Martinsburg, Virginia to minister Charles Philip Krauth. Young Krauth graduated from Gettysburg College (then called Pennsylvania College) in 1839 (while his father served as that school's president), and two years later from the Lutheran Theological Seminary at Gettysburg. From 1841-1852, the younger Rev. Krauth served congregations in Baltimore, Maryland, Martinsburg, and Winchester, Virginia. During the winter of 1853-54, for three months he served the Dutch Reformed congregation in Saint Thomas in the Virgin Islands, where he was visiting on account of his wife's illness. Krauth later published a sketch of this visit entitled A Winter and Spring in the Danish West Indies. Upon returning, Krauth was called to congregations in Pittsburgh from 1855 to 1859, and Philadelphia from 1859 to 1861.

In 1864, he was elected as a member to the American Philosophical Society.

The Confessional Revival 

In 1861, Krauth resigned from parish ministry to serve full-time as editor of The Lutheran, a theological journal.  One of The Lutheran’s goals was to restore the confessions of faith found in the Book of Concord to prominence in Lutheran church life.

These documents, especially the Augsburg Confession, have always been identified as the cornerstones of a distinctively Lutheran theological identity.  But during the eighteenth and nineteenth centuries, Lutherans in the United States had interpreted the confessions very loosely.  A key figure in this movement was Samuel Simon Schmucker, one of Krauth’s professors at Gettysburg, whose “American Lutheranism” as outlined in the Definite Synodical platform of 1855, proposed that the Augsburg Confession was mistaken on such questions as Baptismal Regeneration and the Real Presence in the Eucharist.

In contrast, Krauth and his collaborators (who eventually included his own father and Beale Melanchthon Schmucker, the son of Samuel Simon) preferred a more literal reading of the Lutheran Confessions.  They saw Martin Luther’s theology not as a radical rejection of traditional patristic and medieval theology, but as an essentially conservative return to first principles.  In both theology and worship, they sought to create Lutheranism in which the medieval heritage was more readily apparent than the Enlightenment adaptations.  For example, one of Krauth’s major books, “The Conservative Reformation and its Theology,” is an extended defense of the Real Presence.

Krauth was personally influenced by his reading of the Mercersburg theologians, John Williamson Nevin and Philip Schaff, who had attempted a similar repristination of Calvinist theology within the American branch of the German Reformed Church.  Nevin and Schaff had called themselves “evangelical catholics,” a term which has come to be used rarely, if at all, among the Reformed churches, but quite commonly among Lutherans.  (Church, 226-229).

Similar revival movements like Neo-Lutheranism took place in the early nineteenth century among Roman Catholics and Anglicans, as for example in Guéranger’s re-founding of the abbey at Solesmes, and in the Oxford Movement. European Lutheranism had a similar revival, led by theologians and pastors such as Wilhelm Loehe.

The General Council 

Conflict between the “American Lutherans” and the leaders of the confessional revival led to a schism.  In 1864, Krauth was asked to lead the new seminary in Philadelphia, which was founded by churches of the Pennsylvania Ministerium to rival the seminary in Gettysburg (now known as the Lutheran Theological Seminary at Philadelphia, LTSP).  In 1867, Krauth and his schoolmate Rev. William Passavant founded the General Council of the Evangelical Lutheran Church in America. The General Council had seven regional bodies which had withdrawn from the General Synod.

During Krauth's lifetime, the LTSP was at Franklin Square. In 1889 it moved to Mount Airy. In 1908 its new library there was dedicated as the Krauth Memorial Library in memory of Krauth.

As the first professor of systematic theology at the new seminary, Krauth was at the intellectual center of the reform movement.  He wrote its Fundamental Articles of Faith and Church Polity, as well as  the constitutions for its congregations. His liturgical scholarship guided the formation of General Council worship materials. From 1868, Krauth also served as professor of mental and moral philosophy at the University of Pennsylvania, and from 1873 as vice-provost.

One of Krauth’s most controversial acts was to prepare a series of theses on pulpit and altar fellowship.  Called the “Akron-Galesburg Rule,” these may be summarized as saying “Lutheran pulpits are for Lutheran ministers only, and Lutheran altars are for Lutheran communicants only.”  Although Krauth’s Rule permitted exceptions, it was nonetheless a strong repudiation of the broad ecumenical relationships pursued by the General Synod.

Late travels 
In 1880 he went to Europe to visit the scenes of the life and labors of Martin Luther, in order to complete a biography, for which he had made extensive preparations. His death prevented completion of the project.

Literary works 
 The Conservative Reformation and its Theology, his most significant work (Philadelphia, 1872)
 Tholuck's Commentary on the Gospel of John, translator (1859)
 Christian Liberty in Relation to the Usages of the Evangelical Lutheran Church Maintained and Defended (1860)
 William Fleming's Vocabulary of Philosophy, editor, contributing an introduction and additions (1860; 2d ed.: (Vocabulary of the Philosophical Sciences), enlarged, New York, 1877)
 The Augsburg Confession, translator, contributing a historical introduction, notes, and index (Philadelphia, 1868)
 "Infant Baptism and Infant Salvation in the Calvinistic System," a review of Hodge's Systematic Theology (1874)
 Ulrici's Review of Strauss (1874)
 Berkeley's Principles, Prolegomena, Notes of Ueberweg, and Original Annotations (1874)
 Chronicle of the Augsburg Confession (1878)

Krauth also wrote poems, translated hymns from the Latin and German, and was a frequent contributor to religious periodicals.

Notes

References 
 Bowden, Henry Warner. Dictionary of American Religious Biography. Westport, CT:Greenwood, Press, 1977. . 
 Church, Michael.  “A Beautiful and Right Praxis:  the Ecclesiology of the Common Service,” in Essays and Reports of the Lutheran Historical Conference (1998), vol. 18.
 Franklin, R.W.  Three Nineteenth-Century Churches:  the History of a New Catholicism in Wuerttenburg, England and France.  New York and London, Garland Publishing:  1987.
 
 Nelson, E. Clifford. The Lutherans in North America, revised ed.  Philadelphia:  Fortress, 1980.
 Spaeth, Adolph. “Krauth, Charles Porterfield,” article in H.E. Jacobs, ed., The Lutheran Cyclopedia.  New York Scribner’s, 1899.  A biography by his son-in-law.

External links
 Charles Porterfield Krauth: The American Chemnitz (PDF) by The Revd. Prof. David Jay Webber
 The Conservative Reformation and Its Theology by Charles Porterfield Krauth
 Krauth, Charles Porterfield. The Conservative Reformation and Its Theology: As Represented in the Augsburg Confession and in the Literature of the Evangelical Lutheran Church. Philadelphia: J. B. Lippincott & Co., 1875. (Google Books)
Bente, F. American Lutheranism Volume II St. Louis: Concordia Publishing House. 1919.
 Wolf, Edmund Jacob. The Lutherans in America; a story of struggle, progress, influence and marvelous growth. New York: J. A. Hill, 1889.
 Charles Porterfield Krauth 1823-1883 from The Cyber Hymnal
 Spaeth, Adolph. Charles Porterfield Krauth Vol. 1 New York: The Christian Literature Company. 1898 (Google Books)
 

American Lutherans
American magazine publishers (people)
American Lutheran hymnwriters
People from Gettysburg, Pennsylvania
Religious leaders from Martinsburg, West Virginia
University of Pennsylvania faculty
1823 births
1883 deaths
Gettysburg College alumni
Writers from West Virginia
American Lutheran theologians
Educators from West Virginia
19th-century Lutherans
19th-century American businesspeople
19th-century Lutheran theologians